The women's K-1 500 metres event was an individual kayaking event conducted as part of the Canoeing at the 1960 Summer Olympics program on Lake Albano.

Medalists

Results

Heats
15 competitors entered, but only 13 competed. They first raced in two heats on August 26. The top three finishers from each of the heats advanced directly to the semifinal on the 27th while the rest competed in the repechages the 26th.

Repechages
The seven competitors raced in two repechages on August 26. The top three finishers from each of the repechages advanced directly to the semifinal on the following day.

Semifinal
The top three finishers in the semifinal (raced on August 27) advanced to the final.

Final
The final was held on August 29.

References
1960 Summer Olympics official report Volume 2, Part 1. pp. 266–8.
Sports-reference.com 1960 women's K-1 500 m results.

Women's K-1 500
Olympic
Women's events at the 1960 Summer Olympics